Bio is the tagger name of Wilfredo Feliciano (born 1966). He started painting graffiti on New York City Subway in 1980, and is one of the founding members of the TATS CRU.

The "cru" was formed along with Brim and Mack originally known as T.A.T. Cru. Bio has painted for many major movies and music videos and has exhibited his work throughout the world.

About
Bio has been claimed to be one of the best stylists or letter masters throughout the graffiti movement worldwide, known for his numerous styles of letter, complex and wild styles and use of color.

Wilfredo Feliciano, better known as Bio, is also a founding member of Tats Cru "The Mural Kings", a world-famous art collective. Tats Cru was originally known as TAT Cru and was founded in the 1980s by Bio, along with Brim and Mack. Tats Cru's graffiti art is both commercially and artistically recognized. Wilfredo Feliciano was born in the Bronx. 
The current active members within Cru include:
Hector "Nicer" Nazario
Sotero "Bg183" Ortiz
Raoul "How" Perre
Davide "Nosm" Perre
Totem2

References

External links 
 Tats Cru, Inc. website

1966 births
Living people
American graffiti artists